Camp Dudley Road Historic District is a national historic district located at Westport, in Essex County, New York. The district contains 131 contributing buildings, one contributing site, and one contributing structure.  It consists of an agricultural landscape and includes late-19th and early-20th century seasonal developments.  Among the buildings are vernacular farmhouses in a variety of styles, barn complexes, a stone schoolhouse built in 1816, Skenewood Estate, the Stable Inn properties, Germain property, "Kenjockety," and Barber's Point Lighthouse.  Camp Dudley, the oldest continuing boy's camp is located on a  parcel in the southern part of the district.

It was listed on the National Register of Historic Places in 1993.

References

Historic districts on the National Register of Historic Places in New York (state)
National Register of Historic Places in Essex County, New York